Ughandi is an administrative ward in the Singida Rural District of the Singida Region of Tanzania. The ward lies just outside and to the south-east of the town of Iguguno.

In 2016 the Tanzania National Bureau of Statistics report there were 17,540 people in the ward, from 15,985 in 2012.

References

Wards of Singida Region